"Trust Me" is the second episode of the Once Upon a Time spin-off series Once Upon a Time in Wonderland.

Plot

Alice (Sophie Lowe) develops a plan to find Cyrus (Peter Gadiot) and rushes to find  his genie bottle, hidden somewhere in Wonderland.

Production
Rina Mimoun was the writer for the episode.

Reception

Ratings
The episode was watched by 4.53 million American viewers, and received an 18-49 rating/share of 1.2/4, down significantly from the premiere episode. The show placed fifth in its timeslot and twelfth for the night.

Alex Strachan of Canada.com said, in regards to ratings, "Wonderland’s future may well depend on a change of scenery — a new day and time, no pun intended — where it can be given room to breathe and find an audience" as the series faces competition with The Big Bang Theory.

Critical reception
Amy Ratcliffe of IGN gave the episode an 8.6 out of 10, giving it a positive review. She said "It's just the beginning of the series, but the chess board is set and we're in for an exciting game. Every character has spirit and is moving toward a defined purpose. The evil characters don't seem like they're going to change sides every five minutes, and that's such a relief. Unlike other shows. You know what I'm talking about here. Cough cough, Evil Queen."

Hillary Busis of Entertainment Weekly gave the episode a mixed to negative review, commenting on how the mood of each scene changed too rapidly. She said:

References

External links
 

2013 American television episodes
Once Upon a Time in Wonderland episodes